The Road Goes On Forever may refer to:
 The Road Goes On Forever (The Allman Brothers Band album), 1975
 "The Road Goes On Forever", a 1989 song by Robert Earl Keen
 The Road Goes On Forever (The Highwaymen album), 1995

See also
The Road Goes Ever On, a song cycle by Donald Swann, words from J.R.R. Tolkien's poems